Albrecht von Stosch (20 April 1818 – 29 February 1896) was a German General of the Infantry and admiral who served as first chief of the newly created Imperial German Navy from 1872 to 1883.

Life 
Born in Koblenz, he was a cousin of Hans Stosch-Sarrasani, the founder of the Circus Sarrasani. He was the third son of Prussian general Hermann Ferdinand Stosch, who was a traditional military man who had a nationalistic feelings. Just like his father, Stosch was conscious of the tradition of duty and service, and Prussian military heritage was a strong political opinion of his. 

After being educated in state schools and a Gymnasium, in 1829 Stosch was admitted to the Cadet corps. In 1835 Stosch, aged seventeen, was appointed as second-lieutenant in the Prussian Army. He eventually became a General Staff officer. 

Stosch participated in the Austro-Prussian War as Oberquartiermeister of the Second Army. 

After the Franco-Prussian War, Stosch was also appointed as an admiral and first chief of the Admiralty and thus of the fledgling Imperial German Navy. Acknowledged by William I for his loyal service to the country; he considered himself as a reformer. 

Stosch died in Rheingau. There is an island in Chile named after him, Isla Stosch.

Honours
  Kingdom of Prussia:
 Knight of the Royal Order of the Crown, 2nd Class, 23 September 1865
 Pour le Mérite (military), 20 September 1866
 Commander's Cross of the Royal House Order of Hohenzollern, with Swords, 16 June 1871
 Grand Cross of the Order of the Red Eagle, with Oak Leaves, 18 January 1878
 Knight of the Order of the Black Eagle, 17 September 1881; with Collar, 1882
 : Commander of the Ludwig Order, 1st Class, 15 March 1868
 :
 Grand Cross of the Albert Order, 1867
 Grand Cross of the Order of Merit, with War Decoration, 1871
 : Grand Cross of the Military Merit Order, 2 January 1871
   Sweden-Norway: Grand Cross of the Royal Norwegian Order of Saint Olav, 1 June 1875

References

1818 births
1896 deaths
German Empire politicians
Admirals of the Imperial German Navy
Military personnel from Koblenz
People from the Rhine Province
Generals of Infantry (Prussia)
Members of the Prussian House of Lords
German untitled nobility
Prussian people of the Austro-Prussian War
German military personnel of the Franco-Prussian War
Recipients of the Pour le Mérite (military class)
Grand Crosses of the Military Merit Order (Bavaria)
Grand Crosses of the Order of Franz Joseph
Knights Grand Cross of the Order of Saints Maurice and Lazarus
Recipients of the Order of the Crown (Italy)
Grand Crosses of Military Merit
Recipients of the Order of the Medjidie, 1st class